Parya may refer to:
 Parya language, spoken in Central Asia
 several mountains in Peru:
 Parya (Ayacucho)
 Paria (Peru)
 Puka Parya
 Parya Chaka

See also 
 Parrya, a genus of plants
 Paria (disambiguation)